Af Darelli was a Swedish noble family ennobled (1770) through the physician and assessor Johan Anders Darelius (1718-1780).

External links
https://sok.riksarkivet.se/sbl/Presentation.aspx?id=17281

Swedish noble families